Armando Brasini (Rome, 21 September 1879 - Rome, 18 February 1965) was a prominent Italian architect and urban designer of the early twentieth century and exemplar of Fascist architecture. His work is notable for its eclectic and visionary style inspired by Ancient Roman architecture, Italian Baroque architecture and Giovanni Battista Piranesi.

Biography

Armando Stefano Ludovico Brasini was born in the Roman district of Tor di Nona from a family of modest background, the son of Augusto Brasini and Rosa Piersigilli. After having successfully attended the Institute of Fine Arts, he started specializing in renovation of old buildings and interior decoration. In 1912, he teamed with Marcello Piacentini for the winning entry in a competition for the remodeling of Piazza Navona, which was however not implemented. In 1917 he created stucco decoration in the Palazzo Chigi following its purchase by the Italian state. Immediately after World War I he proposed a colossal memorial to the Battle of Vittorio Veneto, featured a cascade flanked by giant statues, that would have been carved on the nearby Pizzocco mountain. 

In the early 1920s he worked with Giuseppe Volpi, then Governor of Tripolitania, on the remodeling of Tripoli. There he designed the Savings Bank Building (now the country's central bank), the waterfront boulevard (now Ad-dahra Al-kebira), the renovation of the Red Castle, and the memorial to the Italian conquest. In 1925-1926 he also produced the first master plan for the expansion of Tirana, where Italian influence was significant at the time. That plan was partly implemented, and elements of Brasini's design still exist in the layout of Skanderbeg Square and in the city's major north–south axis, now Dëshmorët e Kombit Boulevard. In 1929 he was appointed a member of the newly created Royal Academy of Italy.

Brasini also designed sets and costumes for silent movies, including Theodora (1921) and Quo Vadis (1924).

Brasini had a lifelong interest in urban design. In 1925–27, he conceived a project for a remodeling of Rome's center dubbed the "Mussolini Forum" which would have entailed the demolition of much of the Campo Marzio, leaving the ancient monuments (Pantheon, Column of Marcus Aurelius, Obelisk of Montecitorio) standing alone in the midst of large urban spaces. Brasini's emphasis on facilitating car traffic at the cost of the old city fabric has elicited comparisons with Le Corbusier's 1925 Plan Voisin for Paris, despite the obvious stylistic difference. In 1927, he was commissioned by the Ministry of Public Education to design a master plan for the Flaminio neighborhood, on which he had already worked in 1915.

His prestige projects in Rome included, in the 1920s, the church of the Sacred Heart of Mary in Parioli and the sprawling  on Via di Bravetta, and in the 1930s, the seat of Istituto nazionale per l'assicurazione contro gli infortuni sul lavoro buttressing Quirinal Hill, as well as the Ponte Flaminio.

Brasini produced designs for a number of major projects that were never built. In 1931 he participated in the competition for the Palace of the Soviets in Moscow. In the 1930s he produced various designs for a colossal  in Rome, intended to celebrate Mussolini's imperial achievements and match Albert Speer's plans for Nazi Berlin. Mussolini did not approve the project, however, due to its high costs and competing projects of EUR. In 1939 he designed a new cathedral for Addis Ababa, and in 1956 a colossal lighthouse intended as a monument to Christianity in the Saxa Rubra neighborhood of Rome.

For the EUR, Brasini in 1938 designed a monumental Forestry Institute named after Alessandro Mussolini, Benito's father, whose construction started in 1940 but was suspended in 1942 for war reasons. The partly built structure was demolished in 1957 and replaced by the General House of the Marist Brothers, in spite of Brasini's attempts to promote alternative design options to save the construction.

Following World War II Brasini no longer received major commissions in Italy, but he remained involved in the completion of some of his projects, such as the Ponte Flaminio and the Parioli basilica. He produced plans for the city of Riyadh and a royal palace there, at the invitation of the government of Saudi Arabia (1954), and for a bridge over the Strait of Messina (1956-1963). He died in 1965 in the house he had designed for himself on Via Flaminia.

Assessment

Paolo Portoghesi, while acknowledging the "undoubted architectural merits" of Brasini's designs, defines him as "one of the great misfits of twentieth-century architecture" for generally not being "in tune with the spirit of the times," but rather representing "a case of estrangement from that spirit."

Works

 Villa Toeplitz in Varese (1901)
 Monumental entrance to the Zoological Garden in Rome (1909-1911)
 Villino Tabacchi, Rome (1912), demolished
 Villa Flaminia (Via Flaminia 495), part of the Villa Brasini complex (1920-1925)
 Headquarters of the Savings Bank of Tripolitania, Tripoli (1921-1935), now Central Bank of Libya
 Renovation of the Red Castle of Tripoli (1922-1923)
 Waterfront boulevard, now Al-dahra Al-kabira in Tripoli (1922-24)
 War monument in Tripoli (1922-1925), demolished in the 1950s
 Church of the Sacred Heart of Mary (also known as the Parioli Basilica) in Rome (1923-1954)
 Italian Pavilion at the Decorative Arts Exhibition in Paris (1925), demolished after the event
 Central Museum of the Risorgimento inside the Victor Emmanuel II Monument, Rome (with A. Calzavara, 1924–1935)
 Master plan for the Center of Tirana (1925), partly implemented and modified by Gherardo Bosio after 1939
 , now  near Naples (1925-1930), partly destroyed during World War II
 Villa Manzoni on via Cassia in Rome (1928)
 INAIL building, Via IV Novembre in Rome (with Guido Zevi, 1928–1932)
  in Foggia, now City Hall (1928-1933)
 , now seat of the Province of Taranto (1929-1934)
  in Rome (1929-1934)
 Italian Pavilion at the Paris Colonial Exposition (1931), a smaller-scale reinterpretation of the Severan Basilica in Leptis Magna, demolished after the event's end
  in Naples (1933-38)
 Ponte Flaminio in Rome (1939-51)

Gallery

Honors
 Member of the Royal Academy of Italy, 1929
 Knight of the Grand Cross of the Order of the Crown of Italy 
 Knight of Magistral Grace of the Sovereign Military Order of Malta

See also
 Cesare Bazzani
 Giovanni Muzio
 Paul Bigot
 Ricardo Bofill

Notes

Further reading
 Paolo Nicoloso, Mussolini Architetto, Torino, Einaudi, 2008, ISBN 978-88-06-19086-6
 Antonio Cederna, Mussolini Urbanista, Bari, Laterza, 1979, SBN IT\ICCU\RAV\0065211
 Antonio Labalestra, Il palazzo del Governo di Taranto. La politica, i progetti e il ruolo di Armando Brasini, Roma, Edizioni Quasar, 2018, ISBN 978-88-7140-872-9
 Luigi Monzo: Croci e fasci – Der italienische Kirchenbau in der Zeit des Faschismus, 1919–1945. 2 vol. Karlsruhe 2017 (tesi di dottorato, Karlsruhe Institute of Technology, 2017), pp. 470-478

20th-century Italian architects
Italian fascist architecture